Major-General Edward Charles Ingouville-Williams  (13 December 1861 – 22 July 1916) was a British Army officer of the First World War. He was killed in action while serving as commander of the 34th Division.

Early life and military career
Ingouville-Williams was born in Purbrook, Hampshire, to General Sir John William Collman Williams, KCB, JP, and Georgiana Isabella, the daughter of a wealthy landowner.

He was commissioned as a second lieutenant in the East Kent Regiment (3rd Regiment of Foot; known as "the Buffs") on 23 April 1881. He participated in the Nile Expedition (1884–1885) and served as adjutant to the regiment from 1894 to 1898 after promotion to captain. He was seconded to the Egyptian Army in 1898 and 1899, during which time he took part in the Battle of Atbara and the Battle of Khartoum, for which he was mentioned in despatches.

From 1899 to 1902, he served under Sir Charles Warren in the Second Boer War. He was present at the Relief of Ladysmith and was twice mentioned in despatches during the war. His brother George, a major in the South Staffordshire Regiment was killed in action during the conflict. By the end of the war, he had been awarded the Queen's South Africa Medal King's South Africa Medal, and the Distinguished Service Order, and had been promoted to local lieutenant colonel. He changed his name to Ingouville-Williams in 1902, apparently in memory of his mother, whose maiden name was Ingouville.

In 1903, Ingouville-Williams was transferred to command 2nd Battalion, the Worcestershire Regiment, with whom he spent much of the following five years in India. After completing his tour as a battalion commander, he was appointed a Companion of the Order of the Bath in 1910 and went on to serve as Commandant of the School of Mounted Infantry and then to command the 16th Infantry Brigade from 1912 until the outbreak of the First World War.

First World War
Ingouville-Williams (now a brigadier-general) and his brigade were ordered to France on the outbreak of war, and he remained in command of the 16th until 1915, when he was promoted to major-general and sent to command the newly formed 34th Division, a Kitchener's Army unit. After training, he took the 34th to the Western Front in January 1916 and led the division at the beginning of the Battle of the Somme in summer 1916. He earned another four mentions in despatches during the war. On 22 July, Ingouville-Williams and his aide-de-camp personally inspected the ground on which the division was expected to fight the following week. On his way back, he was caught in an artillery barrage and was killed instantly after being struck by a piece of shrapnel. He was buried at Warloy-Baillon Communal Cemetery extension in France.

References

Bibliography

1861 births
1916 deaths
British Army personnel of the Second Boer War
Companions of the Distinguished Service Order
Companions of the Order of the Bath
British Army major generals
British military personnel killed in the Battle of the Somme
Worcestershire Regiment officers
Buffs (Royal East Kent Regiment) officers
People from Purbrook
British Army generals of World War I
Military personnel from Hampshire
Burials in Hauts-de-France